Randy Stuart (born Elizabeth Shaubell; October 12, 1924 – July 20, 1996), was an American actress in film and television.

Early years 
Stuart's parents, John and Gladys Shaubell, were itinerant musicians in the American South and the Middle West. She was born in Iola in Allen County in southeastern Kansas, and made her stage debut at the age of three.

The Shaubells relocated to Compton, California, where Stuart went to high school and Compton Junior College.

Radio
Stuart was a regular on The Jack Carson Show in 1946.

Film 
A screen test in the play The Women led to Stuart's being placed under contract at 20th Century-Fox. Her film debut was uncredited in the 1947 picture The Foxes of Harrow. Stuart played the birth mother of main character Stephen Fox in the film's initial scene.

In 1948, she played Peggy in the comedy Sitting Pretty. In 1949, she portrayed Lieutenant Eloise Billings in the Howard Hawks film I Was a Male War Bride. That same year, she appeared in Otto Preminger's Whirlpool. Stuart was a supporting role in the musical comedy Dancing in the Dark.

In 1950, Stuart was briefly seen in that year's Best Picture, All About Eve, as a co-conspirator/fellow boarding house resident of Anne Baxter's malevolent character, Eve Harrington. (The same film featured Marilyn Monroe, a classmate of Stuart from dance training at Fox.) Stuart had fourth billing in Stella, with Ann Sheridan and Victor Mature.

In 1951, she appeared as Marge Boyd in I Can Get It For You Wholesale. In 1952, Stuart was part of the comedy Room for One More for Warner Bros.

After 1957's Incredible Shrinking Man, she was cast as Nancy Dawson in the 1958 western film, Man from God's Country, starring George Montgomery. She also guest-starred about that time in Montgomery's short-lived television western television series, Cimarron City.

Television 

Following her last film role in 1958, Stuart appeared for several years in TV dramas (usually westerns), most of them produced by Warner Bros. Television for the ABC network. In 1959 and 1960, Stuart had a recurring role as Nellie Cashman in 11 episodes of the ABC series The Life and Legend of Wyatt Earp, with Hugh O'Brian in the title role of Marshal Wyatt Earp. Nellie was briefly a romantic interest for Earp.

From 1958 to 1961, Stuart guest-starred four times on Clint Walker's ABC/Warner Bros. western Cheyenne, including a role opposite Robert Colbert in the 1960 episode "Two Trails to Santa Fe". In another 1960 role, she played the mentally unbalanced Claire Russo in the episode "Tangled Trail" of Ty Hardin's ABC/WB series, Bronco, which rotated with Cheyenne. Her other western appearances were on Lawman (two appearances), Cimarron City, Colt .45, and with Robert Colbert again in an episode of  Maverick titled "Benefit of Doubt".

Her non-western appearances included the ABC/WB dramas 77 Sunset Strip (as Lucy Norton in the 1962 Cold War-themed episode "The Reluctant Spy", opposite Efrem Zimbalist Jr.), Bourbon Street Beat, The Roaring 20s, One Step Beyond, and Hawaiian Eye (two appearances). She also guest-starred on CBS fantasy-drama The Millionaire. 
 
Stuart's NBC roles included an episode of top-rated Bonanza, "The Duke", directed by Robert Altman and first aired in March 1961, in which she played a saloon girl called Marge Fuller. Earlier, she appeared twice on the 1955-56 NBC comedy It's a Great Life, with Frances Bavier. After a hiatus of five years from television, Stuart returned in 1967 and 1968 as Eileen Gannon, wife of Harry Morgan's character Officer Bill Gannon on NBC's popular Dragnet. Her final TV appearance was as Miss Kallman in the 1975 episode "The Covenant" of ABC's Marcus Welby, M.D., with Robert Young in the title role.

Later years

Personal life and death
Stuart was married to Kenneth Wayne Smith (1943-1945), Edward Charles George (1947-1954 (one child)), Lane Allan (1954-1968 (three children), and Ernest Deneen Wallis (1971-1982). The first three marriages ended in divorce, and the last ended with Wallis's death.

Stuart died of lung cancer on July 20, 1996, at the age of 71 in Bakersfield, California.

Filmography

References

External links

 

1924 births
1996 deaths
American television actresses
American film actresses
Actresses from Kansas
People from Iola, Kansas
People from Compton, California
Actresses from Los Angeles
Actresses from Bakersfield, California
El Camino College Compton Center alumni
20th Century Studios contract players
20th-century American actresses
Deaths from lung cancer in California